Helen Cloud Austin is a social worker and advocate for mental health patients and their families.  A resident of San Antonio, Texas since the early 1960s, Austin began her career in social work after earning both Bachelor of Arts and Master of Science degrees from the Raymond A. Kent School of Social Work at the University of Louisville in Kentucky.  She was only the second black student to attend the Raymond A. Kent School of Social Work.  While there, she was mentored by Martin Luther King Jr.

After graduating, she worked as a social worker at Cook County Psychiatric Hospital in Chicago.  She then moved to Cincinnati, where she worked at Longview State Hospital.  She began her career there as a caseworker, then became the Director of Inpatient Services and, finally, the Chief of Inpatient Services.

In 1962, her husband's job brought them to San Antonio.  While she initially faced discrimination when trying to obtain employment at the San Antonio State Hospital, in 1965 she became their first African-American Chief of Social Services.  During her time there, she established numerous programs to help the mentally ill and their families gain understanding and acceptance.  She has been the recipient of numerous awards, including the National Association of Social Workers' National Social Worker of the Year Award for 1984.

References

External links
 University of Texas at San Antonio Ovations Magazine
 A Guide to the Helen Cloud Austin Papers, University of Texas at San Antonio Libraries (UTSA Libraries) Special Collections
 The Handbook of Texas Online
 Interviews with Helen Cloud Austin, May 27, 1997, June 10, 1997, University of Texas at San Antonio: Institute of Texan Cultures: Oral History Collections, UA 15.01, University of Texas at San Antonio Libraries Special Collections. 

American social workers
Living people
Year of birth missing (living people)